"Hyper Music" and "Feeling Good" are songs by English alternative rock band Muse, recorded for their second album Origin of Symmetry (2001). They were released together as a double A-side single on 19 November 2001.

Composition 
"Hyper Music" is an art punk song, written by vocalist and guitarist Matthew Bellamy. "Feeling Good" was written by Leslie Bricusse and Anthony Newley for the 1964 musical The Roar of the Greasepaint – The Smell of the Crowd, later covered by jazz and soul singer Nina Simone.

A softer, rearranged version of "Hyper Music" was recorded under the title of "Hyper Chondriac Music" and included on Muse's 2002 compilation album Hullabaloo Soundtrack.

Music videos 
The music videos for "Feeling Good" and "Hyper Music" were directed by David Slade. The music video for Hyper Music begins with a shot of a room that has a red floor and greyish walls with Bellamy slouching with a mic in front of him, and a guitar in his hands. The video then changes to a shot next to Bellamy, as he starts playing the song. Seemingly out of nowhere, the rest of the band appears behind him as they all start playing, with shots interspersed with Bellamy playing his guitar alone, before stabilising into just the band playing the song, with a few shots of just Bellamy, with the shots of purely Bellamy increasing when the beginning riff is repeated. When the chorus repeats for the final time a crowd of people appears, jumping around the band. Nearly the entire video is shot very shakily, with apparent lens flares appearing at several moments.

The music video for Feeling Good is rather similar. It begins with Bellamy playing a keyboard instrument. There is clearly a light shining on him. The light's cause is a hole in the roof, from which red petals are falling down on Bellamy. Shots of bizarre looking people are shown walking into light in the same room, with them continuing for the first 30 seconds. As the band yet again appears behind Bellamy, the petals' falling gets heavier. At a bit over the one minute mark the lights mostly disappear, as Bellamy starts singing into a megaphone, accompanied by a change in Bellamy's voice to a buzzing distortion. The lights turn back on as the distortion turns off, and the megaphone is gone, but now the warped looking people are standing behind the band. The people slowly begin climbing up the walls, presumably to escape, as the band keeps playing, with many of the people just staring at the band. In the final moments of the video the majority of the people are seen crawling on the walls.

Release 
"Hyper Music"/"Feeling Good" was released on 19 November 2001 as a 7-inch vinyl single and two CD singles. It reached number 24 in the UK Singles Chart—the lowest of all four singles released from Origin of Symmetry—though sold better than all of them except "Plug in Baby".

Legacy 
"Feeling Good" was ranked as the fifth best cover version in a poll by Total Guitar in 2008. Later in 2010, Muse's cover of "Feeling Good" was ranked by NME as the greatest cover song of all time in September 2010. Over 15,000 people voted it to number one, beating The Beatles' cover of "Twist and Shout" and Johnny Cash's cover of "Hurt". In 2014, a BBC poll saw it voted the ninth best cover version ever.

Muse successfully sued Nescafé in 2003 when their version of "Feeling Good" was used in a television advert without permission, donating the £500,000 compensation to Oxfam. Nescafé later replaced it with the Nina Simone version.  "Feeling Good" is used in Virgin Atlantic's 2010 commercial run in the United States, "001".

"Feeling Good" has been featured in the film Seven Pounds, and the television series John from Cincinnati, Doctor Who Confidential, Queer as Folk, Luther, The Handmaid's Tale, Shameless and Tracy Beaker Returns. Season 8 American Idol runner-up Adam Lambert performed "Feeling Good" on the show, using the arrangement of Muse's version. The song is also featured in the video game The Saboteur.

Track listings

Charts and certifications

Weekly charts

Sales and certifications

Release history

References

External links
 

Muse (band) songs
2001 singles
Music videos directed by David Slade
Songs written by Matt Bellamy
Songs written by Leslie Bricusse
Songs written by Anthony Newley
2001 songs
Mushroom Records singles